One Station Unit Training, sometimes referred to as One Site Unit Training, is a term used by the United States Army to refer to a training program in which recruits remain with the same unit for both Basic Combat Training (BCT) and Advanced Individual Training (AIT). Immediately following Basic Training, the unit seamlessly transforms from a BCT unit into an AIT unit. There is no relocation and the same Drill Sergeants who conducted the Basic Training will continue to instruct all of the participating recruits in their Advanced Individual Training. This streamlines the training schedule and helps to produce more camaraderie between recruits. There are a variety of Military Occupational Specialties (MOS) and training stations that have OSUT training, such as 

 11B and 11C (Infantryman and Indirect Fire Infantryman) at Fort Benning, Georgia  
 12B (Combat Engineer)  at Fort Leonard Wood, Missouri
 12C (Bridge Crewmember) at Fort Leonard Wood, Missouri
 19K (M1 Abrams Crewman) at Fort Benning, Georgia
 19D (Cavalry Scout) at Fort Benning, Georgia
 31B (Military Police) 14th Military Police Brigade at Fort Leonard Wood, Missouri

External links
Fort McClellan
http://www.wood.army.mil/TrainingBdes.htm
http://usmilitary.about.com/od/armytrng/
https://www.benning.army.mil/itb/

United States Army Training and Doctrine Command
Military life
United States Army physical fitness